The Yana (Caaŋı) is a river in Sakha in Russia, located between the Lena to the west and the Indigirka to the east.

Course
Most of this discharge occurs in May and June as the ice on the river breaks up. The Yana freezes up on the surface in October and stays under the ice until late May or early June. In the Verkhoyansk area, it stays frozen to the bottom for 70 to 110 days, and partly frozen for 220 days of the year.

The river begins at the confluence of the rivers Sartang and Dulgalakh in the Yana-Oymyakon Highlands. It flows north across the vast Yana-Indigirka Lowland, part of the greater East Siberian Lowland, shared with the Indigirka to the east. As the river flows into the Yana Bay of the Laptev Sea, it forms a huge river delta covering . Yarok is a large flat island located east of the main mouths of the Yana.

There are approximately 40,000 lakes in the Yana basin, including both alpine lakes formed from glaciation in the Verkhoyansk Mountains (lowlands were always too dry for glaciation) and overflow lakes on the marshy plains in the north of the basin. The whole Yana basin is under continuous permafrost and most is larch woodland grading to tundra north of about 70°N, though trees extend into suitable microhabitats right to the delta.

Verkhoyansk, Batagay, Ust-Kuyga, and Nizhneyansk are the main ports on the Yana.

The Yana basin is the site of the so-called Pole of Cold of Russia, where the lowest recorded temperatures in the Northern Hemisphere are found. Yakut folklore says that, at such temperatures, if you shout to a friend and they cannot hear you, it is because the words have frozen in the air. However, when spring comes the words "thaw" and one can hear everything that was said months ago.

Tributaries
The main tributaries of the Yana are the Adycha, Oldzho, Sartang and Abyrabyt from the right, and the Dulgalakh, Bytantay, Tykakh and Baky from the left. Most of these tributaries are short rivers flowing from the Verkhoyansk Mountains or the Chersky Range, part of the East Siberian Mountains.

History
Evidence of modern human habitation was found in the delta at the Yana RHS (Rhinoceros Horn Site) as early as 32,000 years ago. These people, designated as "Ancient North Siberians”, genetically diverged 38,000 years ago from Western Eurasians, soon after the Western Eurasians split from East Asians.

In 1633–38 Ilya Perfilyev and Ivan Rebrov sailed down the Lena and east along the Arctic coast to the mouth of the Yana and reached the Indigirka estuary. In 1636–42 Elisei Buza followed essentially the same route. In 1638–40, Poznik Ivanov ascended a tributary of the lower Lena, crossed the Verkhoyansk Range to the upper Yana and then crossed the Chersky Range to the Indigirka.

In 1892–1894 Baron Eduard Von Toll, accompanied by expedition leader Alexander von Bunge, carried out geological surveys in the basin of the Yana (among other Far-eastern Siberian rivers) on behalf of the Russian Imperial Academy of Sciences.

See also
List of rivers of Russia
Yana Plateau

References

General References 
William Barr, Baron Eduard Von Toll's Last Expedition. Arctic, Sept 1980.
Alexander von Bunge & Baron Eduard Von Toll, The Expedition to the New Siberian Islands and the Jana country, equipped by the Imperial Academy of Sciences. 1887.

Rivers of the Sakha Republic
  
East Siberian Lowland